The Madden–Julian oscillation (MJO) is the largest element of the intraseasonal (30- to 90-day) variability in the tropical atmosphere. It was discovered in 1971 by Roland Madden and Paul Julian of the American National Center for Atmospheric Research (NCAR). It is a large-scale coupling between atmospheric circulation and tropical deep atmospheric convection. This overall circulation pattern manifests itself most clearly as anomalous rainfall.

The Madden–Julian oscillation is characterized by an eastward progression of large regions of both enhanced and suppressed tropical rainfall, observed mainly over the Indian and Pacific Ocean. The anomalous rainfall is usually first evident over the western Indian Ocean, and remains evident as it propagates over the very warm ocean waters of the western and central tropical Pacific. This pattern of tropical rainfall generally becomes nondescript as it moves over the primarily cooler ocean waters of the eastern Pacific, but reappears when passing over the warmer waters over the Pacific Coast of Central America. The pattern may also occasionally reappear at low amplitude over the tropical Atlantic and higher amplitude over the Indian Ocean. The wet phase of enhanced convection and precipitation is followed by a dry phase where thunderstorm activity is suppressed. Each cycle lasts approximately 30–60 days. Because of this pattern, the Madden–Julian oscillation is also known as the 30- to 60-day oscillation, 30- to 60-day wave, or intraseasonal oscillation.

Behavior 

Distinct patterns of lower-level and upper-level atmospheric circulation anomalies accompany the MJO-related pattern of enhanced or decreased tropical rainfall across the tropics. These circulation features extend around the globe and are not confined to only the eastern hemisphere. The Madden–Julian oscillation moves eastward at between 4 m/s (14 km/h, 9 mph) and 8 m/s (29 km/h, 18 mph) across the tropics, crossing the Earth's tropics in 30 to 60 days—with the active phase of the MJO tracked by the degree of outgoing long wave radiation, which is measured by infrared-sensing geostationary weather satellites.  The lower the amount of outgoing long wave radiation, the stronger the thunderstorm complexes, or convection, is within that region.

Enhanced surface (upper level) westerly winds occur near the west (east) side of the active convection. In advance, or to the east, of the MJO enhanced activity, winds aloft are westerly. In its wake, or to the west of the enhanced rainfall area, winds aloft are easterly. These wind changes aloft are due to the divergence present over the active thunderstorms during the enhanced phase.

Irregularities
The MJO's movement around the globe can occasionally slow or stall during the Northern Hemisphere summer and early autumn, leading to consistently enhanced rainfall for one side of the globe and consistently depressed rainfall for the other side. This can also happen early in the year. The MJO can also go quiet for a period of time, which leads to non-anomalous storm activity in each region of the globe.

Local effects

Connection to the monsoon

During the Northern Hemisphere summer season the MJO-related effects on the Indian and West African summer monsoon are well documented. MJO-related effects on the North American summer monsoon also occur, though they are relatively weaker.  MJO-related impacts on the North American summer precipitation patterns are strongly linked to meridional (i.e. north–south) adjustments of the precipitation pattern in the eastern tropical Pacific. A strong relationship between the leading mode of intraseasonal variability of the North American Monsoon System, the MJO and the points of origin of tropical cyclones is also present.

A period of warming sea surface temperatures is found five to ten days prior to a strengthening of MJO-related precipitation across southern Asia.  A break in the Asian monsoon, normally during the month of July, has been attributed to the Madden–Julian oscillation after its enhanced phase moves off to the east of the region into the open tropical Pacific Ocean.

Influence on tropical cyclogenesis 

Tropical cyclones occur throughout the boreal warm season (typically May–November) in both the north Pacific and the north Atlantic basins—but any given year has periods of enhanced or suppressed activity within the season. Evidence suggests that the Madden–Julian oscillation modulates this activity (particularly for the strongest storms) by providing a large-scale environment that is favorable (or unfavorable) for development.  MJO-related descending motion is not favorable for tropical storm development.  However, MJO-related ascending motion is a favorable pattern for thunderstorm formation within the tropics, which is quite favorable for tropical storm development. As the MJO progresses eastward, the favored region for tropical cyclone activity also shifts eastward from the western Pacific to the eastern Pacific and finally to the Atlantic basin.

An inverse relationship exists between tropical cyclone activity in the western north Pacific basin and the north Atlantic basin, however. When one basin is active, the other is normally quiet, and vice versa. The main reason for this appears to be the phase of the MJO, which is normally in opposite modes between the two basins at any given time.  While this relationship appears robust, the MJO is one of many factors that contribute to the development of tropical cyclones. For example, sea surface temperatures must be sufficiently warm and vertical wind shear must be sufficiently weak for tropical disturbances to form and persist.  However, the MJO also influences these conditions that facilitate or suppress tropical cyclone formation. The MJO is monitored routinely by both the USA National Hurricane Center and the USA Climate Prediction Center during the Atlantic hurricane (tropical cyclone) season to aid in anticipating periods of relative activity or inactivity.

Downstream effects

Link to the El Niño-Southern oscillation 

There is strong year-to-year (interannual) variability in Madden–Julian oscillation activity, with long periods of strong activity followed by periods in which the oscillation is weak or absent. This interannual variability of the MJO is partly linked to the El Niño–Southern Oscillation (ENSO) cycle. In the Pacific, strong MJO activity is often observed 6 to 12 months prior to the onset of an El Niño episode, but is virtually absent during the maxima of some El Niño episodes, while MJO activity is typically greater during a La Niña episode.  Strong events in the Madden–Julian oscillation over a series of months in the western Pacific can speed the development of an El Niño or La Niña but usually do not in themselves lead to the onset of a warm or cold ENSO event. However, observations suggest that the 1982-1983 El Niño developed rapidly during July 1982 in direct response to a Kelvin wave triggered by an MJO event during late May. Further, changes in the structure of the MJO with the seasonal cycle and ENSO might facilitate more substantial impacts of the MJO on ENSO. For example, the surface westerly winds associated with active MJO convection are stronger during advancement toward El Niño and the surface easterly winds associated with the suppressed convective phase are stronger during advancement toward La Niña. Globally, the interannual variability of the MJO is most determined by atmospheric internal dynamics, rather than surface conditions.

North American winter precipitation 

The strongest impacts of intraseasonal variability on the United States occur during the winter months over the western U.S. During the winter this region receives the bulk of its annual precipitation. Storms in this region can last for several days or more and are often accompanied by persistent atmospheric circulation features. Of particular concern are extreme precipitation events linked to flooding. Strong evidence suggests a link between weather and climate in this region from studies that have related the El Niño Southern Oscillation to regional precipitation variability. In the tropical Pacific, winters with weak-to-moderate cold, or La Niña, episodes or ENSO-neutral conditions are often characterized by enhanced 30- to 60-day Madden–Julian oscillation activity. A recent example is the winter of 1996–1997, which featured heavy flooding in California and in the Pacific Northwest (estimated damage costs of $2.0–3.0 billion at the time of the event) and a very active MJO. Such winters are also characterized by relatively small sea surface temperature anomalies in the tropical Pacific compared to stronger warm and cold episodes. In these winters, there is a stronger link between the MJO events and extreme west coast precipitation events.

Pineapple Express events 

The typical scenario linking the pattern of tropical rainfall associated with the MJO to extreme precipitation events in the Pacific Northwest features a progressive (i.e. eastward moving) circulation pattern in the tropics and a retrograding (i.e. westward moving) circulation pattern in the mid latitudes of the North Pacific. Typical wintertime weather anomalies preceding heavy precipitation events in the Pacific Northwest are as follows:
 7–10 days prior to the heavy precipitation event: Heavy tropical rainfall associated with the MJO shifts eastward from the eastern Indian Ocean to the western tropical Pacific. A moisture plume extends northeastward from the western tropical Pacific towards the general vicinity of the Hawaiian Islands. A strong blocking anticyclone is located in the Gulf of Alaska with a strong polar jet stream around its northern flank.
 3–5 days prior to the heavy precipitation event: Heavy tropical rainfall shifts eastward towards the date line and begins to diminish. The associated moisture plume extends further to the northeast, often traversing the Hawaiian Islands. The strong blocking high weakens and shifts westward. A split in the North Pacific jet stream develops, characterized by an increase in the amplitude and areal extent of the upper tropospheric westerly zonal winds on the southern flank of the block and a decrease on its northern flank. The tropical and extra tropical circulation patterns begin to "phase", allowing a developing mid latitude trough to tap the moisture plume extending from the deep tropics.
 The heavy precipitation event: As the pattern of enhanced tropical rainfall continues to shift further to the east and weaken, the deep tropical moisture plume extends from the subtropical central Pacific into the mid latitude trough now located off the west coast of North America. The jet stream at upper levels extends across the North Pacific with the mean jet position entering North America in the northwestern United States. The deep low pressure located near the Pacific Northwest coast can bring up to several days of heavy rain and possible flooding. These events are often referred to as Pineapple Express events, so named because a significant amount of the deep tropical moisture traverses the Hawaiian Islands on its way towards western North America.

Throughout this evolution, retrogression of the large-scale atmospheric circulation features is observed in the eastern Pacific–North American sector. Many of these events are characterized by the progression of the heaviest precipitation from south to north along the Pacific Northwest coast over a period of several days to more than one week. However, it is important to differentiate the individual synoptic-scale storms, which generally move west to east, from the overall large-scale pattern, which exhibits retrogression.

A coherent simultaneous relationship exists between the longitudinal position of maximum MJO-related rainfall and the location of extreme west coast precipitation events. Extreme events in the Pacific Northwest are accompanied by enhanced precipitation over the western tropical Pacific and the region of Southeast Asia called by meteorologists the Maritime Continent, with suppressed precipitation over the Indian Ocean and the central Pacific. As the region of interest shifts from the Pacific Northwest to California, the region of enhanced tropical precipitation shifts further to the east. For example, extreme rainfall events in southern California are typically accompanied by enhanced precipitation near 170°E. However, it is important to note that the overall link between the MJO and extreme west coast precipitation events weakens as the region of interest shifts southward along the west coast of the United States.

There is case-to-case variability in the amplitude and longitudinal extent of the MJO-related precipitation, so this should be viewed as a general relationship only.

Explaining MJO's dynamics with equatorial modons and equatorial adjustment

Eastward propagating structure of barotropic equatorial modon

In 2019, Rostami and Zeitlin  reported a discovery of steady, long-living, slowly eastward-moving large-scale coherent twin cyclones, so-called equatorial modons, by means of a moist-convective rotating shallow water model.  Crudest barotropic features of MJO such as eastward propagation along the equator, slow phase speed, hydro-dynamical coherent structure, the convergent zone of moist-convection, are captured by Rostami and Zeitlin's modon. Having an exact solution of streamlines for internal and external regions of equatorial asymptotic modon is another feature of this structure. It is shown that such eastward-moving coherent dipolar structures can be produced during geostrophic adjustment of localized large-scale pressure anomalies in the diabatic moist-convective environment on the equator.

Generation of MJO-like structure by geostrophic adjustment in the lower troposphere
In 2020, a study showed that the process of relaxation (adjustment) of localized large-scale pressure anomalies in the lower equatorial troposphere, generates structures strongly resembling the Madden Julian Oscillation (MJO) events, as seen in vorticity, pressure, and moisture fields. Indeed, it is demonstrated that baroclinicity and moist convection substantially change the scenario of the quasi-barotropic "dry" adjustment, which was established in the framework of one-layer shallow water model and consists, in the long-wave sector, in the emission of equatorial Rossby waves, with dipolar meridional structure, to the West, and of equatorial Kelvin waves, to the East. If moist convection is strong enough, a dipolar cyclonic structure, which appears in the process of adjustment as a Rossby-wave response to the perturbation, transforms into a coherent modon-like structure in the lower layer, which couples with a baroclinic Kelvin wave through a zone of enhanced convection and produces, at initial stages of the process, a self-sustained slowly eastward-propagating zonally- dissymmetrical quadrupolar vorticity pattern.

In 2022, Rostami et al  advanced their theory. By means of a new multi-layer pseudo-spectral moist-convective Thermal Rotating Shallow Water (mcTRSW) model in a full sphere, they presented a possible equatorial adjustment beyond Gill's mechanism for the genesis and dynamics of the MJO. According to this theory, an eastward propagating MJO-like structure can be generated in a self-sustained and self-propelled manner due to nonlinear relaxation (adjustment) of a large-scale positive buoyancy anomaly, depressed anomaly, or a combination of them, as soon as this anomaly reaches a critical threshold in the presence of moist-convection at the equator. This MJO-like episode possesses a convectively coupled “hybrid structure” that consists of a “quasi equatorial modon”, with an enhanced vortex pair, and a convectively coupled baroclinic Kelvin wave (BKW), with greater phase speed than that of dipolar structure on the intraseasonal time scale. Interaction of the BKW, after circumnavigating all around the equator, with a new large-scale buoyancy anomaly may contribute to excitation of a recurrent generation of the next cycle of MJO-like structure. Overall, the generated "hybrid structure” captures a few of the crudest features of the MJO, including its quadrupolar structure, convective activity, condensation patterns, vorticity field, phase speed, and westerly and easterly inflows in the lower and upper troposphere. Although the moisture-fed convection is a necessary condition for the ``hybrid structure” to be excited and maintained in the proposed theory in this theory, it is fundamentally different from the moisture-mode ones. Because the barotropic equatorial modon and BKW also exist in “dry” environments, while there are no similar “dry” dynamical basic structures in the moisture-mode theories. The proposed theory can be a possible mechanism to explain the genesis and backbone structure of the MJO and to converge some theories that previously seemed divergent.

Impact of climate change on MJO
The MJO travels a stretch of 12,000–20,000 km over the tropical oceans, mainly over the Indo-Pacific warm pool, which has ocean temperatures generally warmer than 28 °C.  This Indo-Pacific warm pool has been warming rapidly, altering the residence time of MJO over the tropical oceans. While the total lifespan of MJO remains in the 30–60 day timescale, its residence time has shortened over the Indian Ocean by 3–4 days (from an average of 19 days to 15 days) and increased by 5–6 days over the West Pacific (from an average of 18 days to 23 days). This change in the residence time of MJO has altered the rainfall patterns across the globe.

References

External links 

 
 
 

 

Tropical meteorology
Atmospheric dynamics
Climate oscillations